Second Cabinet of Donald Tusk was the government of Poland from 18 November 2011 to 22 September 2014, sitting in the Council of Ministers during the 7th legislature of the Sejm and the 8th legislature of the Senate. It was appointed by President Bronisław Komorowski on 18 November 2011, and passed the vote of confidence in Sejm on 19 November 2011. Led by Donald Tusk, it is a centre-right coalition of two parties: Tusk's liberal conservative Civic Platform (PO) and the agrarian Polish People's Party (PSL). By law, all vacant ministries will be led by a Deputy Prime Minister in an acting position.

Tusk, Donald II
Cabinet of Donald Tusk II
Cabinet of Donald Tusk II
2011 establishments in Poland
Cabinets established in 2011